Eorhynchochelys (meaning "dawn-beaked turtle" in Greek) is an extinct genus of stem-turtle from the Late Triassic Xiaowa Formation (or Wayao Member of the Falang Formation) of southwestern China.

Description
Eorhynchochelys is notable for its unusual combination of a turtle-style skull and a conventional reptilian body. The skull, for example, has an edentulous beak typical of all members of Testudinata. However, the thorax region is markedly different from Pappochelys and Odontochelys and more similar to Eunotosaurus in lacking a shell, even though the ribs were wide and flat. The skull also has a single pair of holes behind the skull, unlike the presence of two pairs of holes in Pappochelys. Unlike other stem-turtles, Eorhynchochelys had twelve dorsal vertebrae.

References

Pantestudines
Triassic reptiles of Asia
Transitional fossils
Fossil taxa described in 2018
Prehistoric reptile genera